Ryuko Hirano  is a Japanese athlete.  She won the silver medal in  the 800 metres event in the 1962 Asian Games.

References

Athletes (track and field) at the 1962 Asian Games
Asian Games silver medalists for Japan
Asian Games medalists in athletics (track and field)
Medalists at the 1962 Asian Games
Living people
Year of birth missing (living people)
Japanese female middle-distance runners
20th-century Japanese women